

Further information 
The school gained specialist college status in 2005. Millfield consists of:
 A Block (the original buildings) - which houses Arts, Technology (resistant materials and food studies), I.C.T, Drama, Dance, Canteen, Offices, Medical room, Media studies and Performing Arts
 B, C and D Block (the tower block) - which houses Biology, Chemistry, Physics, French and Spanish
 F  and G Block (the southern block) - which houses Geography, History, Religious Education, Citizenship and the Library 
 H Block (the northern block downstairs) - which houses Maths 
 J Block (the northern block upstairs) - which houses both English Language and English Literature.

The school has a large field, two tarmac playgrounds and sports hall for P.E sessions and for use by the school sport clubs.

References

External links
 Ofsted page on Millfield High School including inspection reports
 Millfield High School website

Secondary schools in Lancashire
Schools in the Borough of Wyre
Community schools in Lancashire